The Greek football league system consists of two professional leagues, one nationwide non-professional league, and several regional non-professional leagues.

Cup eligibility
Greek Football Professional Cup: Levels 1 to 2
Greek Football Amateur Cup: Level 3

Promotion and relegation
Super League 1: Bottom two clubs are relegated to the Super League 2.
Super League 2: Winners of two groups are promoted to Super League 1. Bottom four clubs of two groups are relegated to the Gamma Ethniki. 
Gamma Ethniki: The champions of each group are promoted to the Super League 2. Twenty seven teams in total are relegated to the local championships.
Local championships: The top team in each regional league qualifies for the promotional play-offs . Three top teams of each of 8 promotional play-offs' groups (24 total) are promoted to Gamma Ethniki.

Starting season 2023-24, Gamma Ethniki will be divided in 4 groups with 18 teams each, winners of each group will promote to professional Super League 2 and the bottom 6 teams will be relegated to Local championship.
As of season 2024-25, Super League 2 will have 18 clubs total in a single group, top two will be promoted to Super League 1 , and bottom 4 teams will lose proffesional staus and be relegated to non-professional Gamma Ethniki.

League Pyramid

See also
Football records and statistics in Greece

References

 new league system for 2019-20 

 
Football league systems in Europe